Gerhard Mayer (born May 20, 1980 in Vienna) is a male discus thrower from Austria.

He represented his native country at the 2008 Summer Olympics in Beijing, where he ended up in 18th place in the overall-rankings.  He also competed at the 2012 Summer Olympics, finishing in 24th place. Mayer is best known for winning the gold medal in the men's discus event at the 2007 Summer Universiade in Bangkok, Thailand.

Achievements

References

External links
 
 
 

1980 births
Living people
Austrian male discus throwers
Athletes (track and field) at the 2008 Summer Olympics
Athletes (track and field) at the 2012 Summer Olympics
Athletes (track and field) at the 2016 Summer Olympics
Olympic athletes of Austria
Athletes from Vienna
World Athletics Championships athletes for Austria
European Games gold medalists for Austria
Athletes (track and field) at the 2015 European Games
European Games medalists in athletics
Universiade medalists in athletics (track and field)
Universiade gold medalists for Austria
Medalists at the 2007 Summer Universiade